The 1931 Michigan Wolverines football team represented the University of Michigan in the 1931 college football season. In their third year under head coach was Harry Kipke, the Wolverines compiled a record of 8-1-1 record (5-1 Big Ten), outscored opponents 181 to 27, and finished the season in a three-way tie with Purdue and Northwestern for first place in the Big Ten Conference. Defensively, the team shut out eight of ten opponents, allowed an average of only 2.7 points per game, and did not allow opponents to score a point in its final six games. After losing to Ohio State on October 17, 1931, the Wolverines went 22 games and nearly three years before losing another game on October 6, 1934.

Individual players of note on the 1931 Michigan team include center Maynard Morrison, who was selected as a first-team All-American by Grantland Rice for Collier's Weekly and by the Newspaper Enterprise Association (NEA).  Bill Hewitt was selected as the teams Most Valuable Player and a first-team All-Big Ten halfback by the United Press (UP). Ivy Williamson was selected as a first-team All-Big Ten end by both the UP and Associated Press (AP).

Schedule

Season summary

Week 1: Doubleheader

Central State Teachers
Michigan opened its 1931 season with a football doubleheader on October 3, 1931.  The games attracted a crowd of nearly 80,000, most of whom were high school students invited by the university to attend the game without charge.

Michigan's touchdowns were scored by halfback Jack Heston (the son of former Michigan star Willie Heston), fullback Roderick Cox (1933 NCAA champion in the hammer throw), end Ted Petoskey, and substitute halfback Herbert Schmidt. Petoskey also kicked three points after touchdown.

Michigan's starting lineup against the Central State Teachers was Ted Petoskey (left end), DuVal Goldsmith (left tackle), John Kowalik (left guard), Thomas Cooke (center), Leslie Frisk (right guard), Cecil Cantrill (right tackle), Norm Daniels (right end), Louis Westover (quarterback), Heston (left halfback), Estel Tessmer (right halfback), and Roderick Cox (fullback).

Michigan Normal

In the second game of the doubleheader, Michigan's first-team players defeated  by a 34 to 0 score. Michigan's touchdowns were scored by halfback Herman Everhardus (one-yard run in second quarter), backup halfback Jack Heston (16-yard run in second quarter), guard Stanley Hozer (four-yard run in second quarter), end Ted Petoskey (25-yard pass from William Renner), and halfback Stanley Fay (short run in second half). Hozer kicked two points after touchdown, and Petoskey and Omer LaJeunesse kicked one each.

Michigan's starting lineup against Michigan Normal was Bill Hewitt (left end), Howie Auer (left tackle), Hozer (left guard), Maynard Morrison (center), LaJeunesse (right guard), Tom Samuels (right tackle), Ivy Williamson (right end), Harry Newman (quarterback), Everhardus (left halfback), Stanley Fay (right halfback), and Roy Hudson (fullback).

Week 2: Chicago

On October 10, 1931, Michigan defeated Amos Alonzo Stagg's Chicago Maroons by a 13 to 7 score. Both of Michigan's touchdowns were scored in the second quarter on passes thrown by Harry Newman. Stanley Fay caught the first one, and Roy Hudson the second one. Newman also kicked a point after touchdown.

Michigan's starting lineup against Chicago was Bill Hewitt (left end), Howie Auer (left tackle), Leslie Douglass (left guard), Maynard Morrison (center), Omer LaJeunesse (right guard), Tom Samuels (right tackle), Ivy Williamson (right end), Louis Westover (quarterback), Stanley Fay (left halfback), Jack Heston (right halfback), and Roy Hudson (fullback).

Week 3: Ohio State

On October 17, Michigan suffered its only loss of the season, falling to Ohio State by a 20 to 7 score. Jack Heston fumbled the opening kickoff at Michigan's 24-yard line.  The defense held, but Heston then fumbled again on the next drive at Michigan's 31-yard line. Bill Carroll then ran for a touchdown in the first quarter. Ohio State's sophomore quarterback Carl Cramer also scored two touchdowns, including a 42-yard punt return in the fourth quarter. Michigan's only touchdown was scored by end Ivy Williamson with DuVal Goldsmith kicking the extra point. After losing to Ohio State, the Wolverines went 22 games and nearly three years before losing another game.

Michigan's starting lineup against Ohio State was Bill Hewitt (left end), Howie Auer (left tackle), Omer LaJeunesse (left guard), Maynard Morrison (center), John Kowalik (right guard), Tom Samuels (right tackle), Ivy Williamson (right end), Harry Newman (quarterback), Jack Heston (left halfback), Stanley Fay (right halfback), and Roy Hudson (fullback).

Week 4: at Illinois

On October 24, Michigan defeated Illinois by a 35 to 0 score. Michigan's 35 points was the most scored against an Illinois team under head coach Robert Zuppke. Fullback Bill Hewitt averaged over six yards per carry on 24 carries. Michigan's five touchdowns were scored by Stanley Fay (2), Jack Heston John Kowalik, and Harry Newman (45-yard interception return). Ted Petoskey kicked two points after touchdown, and Newman kicked three.

Michigan's starting lineup against Ohio State was Petoskey (left end), Francis Wistert (left tackle), Stanley Hozer (left guard), Maynard Morrison (center), Omer LaJeunesse (right guard), Howie Auer (right tackle), Ivy Williamson (right end), Estel Tessmer (quarterback), Heston (left halfback), Fay (right halfback), and Hewitt (fullback).

Week 5: at Princeton

On October 31, Michigan defeated Princeton by a 21 to 0 score at Palmer Stadium in Princeton, New Jersey.  Left halfback Stanley Fay scored two touchdowns for Michigan, and fullback Roy Hudson scored one. Harry Newman kicked two points after touchdown, and Ted Petoskey scored one.

Michigan's starting lineup against Princeton was Ivy Williamson (left end), Tom Samuels (left tackle), Omer LaJeunesse (left guard), Maynard Morrison (center), Stanley Hozer (right guard), ___ (right tackle), Ted Petoskey (right end), Bill Hewitt (quarterback), Fay (left halfback), Estel Tessmer (right halfback), and Roy Hudson (fullback).

Week 6: Indiana

On November 7, Michigan defeated  by a 22 to 0 score at Michigan Stadium. Michigan touchdowns were scored by Stanley Fay, Ivy Williamson and Bill Hewitt.  Williamson was also credited with a safety. Ted Petoskey and Harry Newman each kicked a point after touchdown.

Michigan's starting lineup against Indiana was Petoskey (left end), Howie Auer (left tackle), Stanley Hozer (left guard), Maynard Morrison (center), John Kowalik (right guard), Tom Samuels (right tackle), Williamson (right end), Estel Tessmer (quarterback), Fay (left halfback), Roy Hudson (right halfback), and Hewitt (fullback).

Week 7: Michigan State

On November 14, Michigan played Michigan State to a scoreless tie at Michigan Stadium. Michigan's starting lineup against Michigan State was Ted Petoskey (left end), Howie Auer (left tackle), Omer LaJeunesse (left guard), Chuck Bernard (center), Stanley Hozer (right guard), Tom Samuels (right tackle), Ivy Williamson (right end), Roy Hudson (quarterback), Jack Heston (left halfback), Stanley Fay (right halfback), and Bill Hewitt (fullback).

Week 8: Minnesota

On November 21, Michigan defeated Minnesota by a 6 to 0 score at Michigan Stadium. Michigan's only points came on a 56-yard run by Bill Hewitt in the first quarter. The starting lineup against Minnesota was Ted Petoskey (left end), Howie Auer (left tackle), Omer LaJeunesse (left guard), Maynard Morrison (center), Stanley Hozer (right guard), Tom Samuels (right tackle), Ivy Williamson (right end), Roy Hudson (quarterback), Jack Heston (left halfback), Stanley Fay (right halfback), and Hewitt (fullback).

Week 9: Wisconsin

On November 28, Michigan defeated Wisconsin by a 16 to 0 score at Michigan Stadium. Michigan touchdowns were scored by Bill Hewitt and Roy Hudson.  Hudson also kicked a field goal, and Herman Everhardus kicked an extra point. The starting lineup against Wisconsin was Ted Petoskey (left end), Howie Auer (left tackle), Cecil Cantrill (left guard), Chuck Bernard (center), John Kowalik (right guard), Francis Wistert (right tackle), Ivy Williamson (right end), Harry Newman (quarterback), Everhardus (left halfback), Hudson (right halfback), and Hewitt (fullback).

Scoring summary

Players

Varsity letter winners
 Howie Auer, Bay City, Michigan - started 8 games at left tackle, 1 game at right tackle
 Chuck Bernard - center
 Cecil Cantrill, Lexington, Kentucky - started 1 game at right tackle
 Norm Daniels, Detroit, Michigan, Southeastern H.S. - started 1 game at right end
 Charles DeBaker - halfback
 Leslie H. Douglass, Gary, Indiana, Emerson H.S. - started 1 game at left guard
 Herman Everhardus, Kalamazoo, Michigan, Central H.S. - started 1 game at left halfback
 Stanley Fay, Detroit, Michigan, Northwestern H.S. - started 4 games at left halfback, 5 games at right halfback
 Leslie L. Frisk, Rock Island, Illinois - started 1 game at right guard
 DuVal P. Goldsmith, Christiansburg, Virginia, Fishburne Military Academy - started 1 game at left tackle
 Jack Heston, Detroit, Michigan, Northwestern H.S. - started 4 games at left halfback, 3 games at right halfback
 Bill Hewitt, Bay City, Michigan - started 4 games at left end, 5 games at fullback
 Stanley Hozer, Muskegon, Michigan - started 3 games at left guard, 3 games at right guard
 Roy Hudson, Girard, Ohio - 4 games at fullback, started 2 games at quarterback, 1 game at left halfback, 1 game at right halfback
 John Kowalik, Chicago, Illinois, Carl Schurz H.S. - 2 games at left guard, 2 games at right guard
 Omer LaJeunesse, Iron Mountain, Michigan - started 4 games at left guard, 4 games at right guard
 Maynard Morrison, Royal Oak, Michigan - started 9 games at center
 Harry Newman, Detroit, Michigan, Northern H.S. - started 3 games at quarterback
 Ted Petoskey, St. Charles, Michigan - started 6 games at left end
 Tom Samuels, Canton, Ohio, McKinley H.S. - started 8 games at right tackle
 Jay H. Sikkenga - guard
 Estel Tessmer, Ann Arbor, Michigan - started 3 games at quarterback, 1 game at right halfback
 Louis Westover, Bay City, Michigan, Central H.S. - started 2 games at quarterback
 Ivy Williamson, Toledo, Ohio, Bowling Green Central - started 9 games at right end
 Francis Wistert, Chicago, Illinois, Carl Schurz H.S. - started 1 game at left tackle
 Fielding H. Yost, Jr. - end

Varsity reserves
 George K. Bremen, halfback, Detroit, Michigan
 Harvey E. Chapman, tackle, Detroit, Michigan
 Frederick P. Clohset, tackle, Bay City, Michigan
 James Conover, guard, Ann Arbor, Michigan
 Thomas M. Cooke, tackle, Chicago, Illinois, Senn H.S. - started 1 game at center
 Roderick Cox, fullback, Birmingham, Michigan - started 1 game at left end, 1 game at right end, 1 game at fullback
 Russell Damm, tackle, Muskegon, Michigan
 Harry Eastman, Jr., halfback, Detroit, Michigan
 Harold Ellerby, end, Birmingham, Michigan
 Leslie L. Frisk, tackle, Rock Island, Illinois
 Francis Hazen, tackle, Bellingham, Washington
 William Horner, end, Jackson, Michigan
 Bethel B. Kelley, end, Bardstown, Kentucky
 Harold D. Lindsay, Detroit, Michigan 
 Abe Marcovsky, guard, Pittsburgh, Pennsylvania
 Louis E. McCrath, tackle, Grand Rapids, Michigan
 Donald T. McGuire, end, South Haven, Michigan
 Leonard Meldman, tackle, Detroit, Michigan
 Robert E. Miller, tackle, Highland Park, Michigan
 Wallace B. Miller, tackle, Wilmette, Illinois
 Ward H. Oehmann, guard, Washington, D.C.
 William Renner, halfback, Youngstown, Ohio
 Carl Savage, tackle, Flint, Michigan
 Harry A. Shick, Jackson, Michigan 
 Oscar A. Singer, guard, Jackson Heights, New York
 Harry Stinespring, quarterback, Chicago, Illinois
 Charles E. Stone, end, Detroit, Michigan
 Harry A. Tillotson, Ann Arbor, Michigan
 J. Leo Winston, center, Washington, D.C.

Awards and honors
 Captain: Roy Hudson
All-American: Maynard Morrison (COL-1, NEA-1, AP-3, CP-3), Bill Hewitt (NEA-3)
All-Big Ten: Maynard Morrison (AP-1, CPT-1, UP-2), Ivy Williamson (AP-1, UP-1), Bill Hewitt (UP-1, CPT-1; AP-2), Harry Newman (AP-2), Ted Petoskey (UP-2), Howie Auer (UP-2), Stanley Fay (AP-2, UP-2)
Most Valuable Player: Bill Hewitt
Meyer Morton Award: Herman Everhardus

Coaching staff
Head coach: Harry Kipke
Assistant coaches
 Backfield coach: Wally Weber
 Line coach: Jack Blott and Franklin Cappon
 End coach: Bennie Oosterbaan
 "B" team coach: Ray Courtright and Cliff Keen
 Freshmen coach: Ray Fisher assisted by Bud Poorman, Jack Wheeler, and Alvin Dahlern
Trainer: Ray Roberts
Manager: John Sauchuck, assisted by Rehn Nelson, Louis Columbo, Elbert Gage, and William Jones

References

External links
  1931 Football Team -- Bentley Historical Library, University of Michigan Athletics History

Michigan
Michigan Wolverines football seasons
Big Ten Conference football champion seasons
Michigan Wolverines football